Dimetrodon ( or ,) meaning "two measures of teeth,” is an extinct genus of non-mammalian synapsid that lived during the Cisuralian (Early Permian), around 295–272 million years ago (Mya). It is a member of the family Sphenacodontidae. The most prominent feature of Dimetrodon is the large neural spine sail on its back formed by elongated spines extending from the vertebrae. It walked on four legs and had a tall, curved skull with large teeth of different sizes set along the jaws. Most fossils have been found in the Southwestern United States, the majority coming from a geological deposit called the Red Beds of Texas and Oklahoma. More recently, its fossils have been found in Germany. Over a dozen species have been named since the genus was first erected in 1878.

Dimetrodon is often mistaken for a dinosaur or as a contemporary of dinosaurs in popular culture, but it became extinct some 40 million years before the first appearance of dinosaurs. Reptile-like in appearance and physiology, Dimetrodon is nevertheless more closely related to mammals than to modern reptiles, though it is not a direct ancestor of mammals. Dimetrodon is assigned to the "non-mammalian synapsids", a group traditionally – but incorrectly – called "mammal-like reptiles", and now known as stem mammals. This groups Dimetrodon together with mammals in a clade (evolutionary group) called Synapsida, while placing dinosaurs, reptiles, and birds in a separate clade, the Sauropsida. Single openings in the skull behind each eye, known as temporal fenestrae, and other skull features distinguish Dimetrodon and mammals from most of the earliest sauropsids.

Dimetrodon was probably one of the apex predators of the Cisuralian ecosystems, feeding on fish and tetrapods, including reptiles and amphibians. Smaller Dimetrodon species may have had different ecological roles. The sail of Dimetrodon may have been used to stabilize its spine or to heat and cool its body as a form of thermoregulation. Some recent studies argue that the sail would have been ineffective at removing heat from the body due to large species being discovered with small sails and small species being discovered with large sails, essentially ruling out heat regulation as its main purpose. The sail was most likely used in courtship display with methods such as threatening rivals or showing off to potential mates.

Description 

Dimetrodon was a quadrupedal, sail-backed synapsid. The larger species of Dimetrodon were among the largest predators of the Early Permian, although the closely related Tappenosaurus, known from skeletal fragments in slightly younger rocks, may have been even larger at an estimated  in total body length. Although some Dimetrodon species could grow very large, many juvenile specimens are known.

Skull 

A single large opening on either side of the back of the skull links Dimetrodon with mammals and distinguishes it from most of the earliest sauropsids, which either lack openings or have two openings. Features such as ridges on the inside of the nasal cavity and a ridge at the back of the lower jaw are thought to be part of an evolutionary progression from early four-limbed land-dwelling vertebrates to mammals.

The skull of Dimetrodon is tall and compressed laterally, or side-to-side. The eye sockets are positioned high and far back in the skull. Behind each eye socket is a single hole called an infratemporal fenestra. An additional hole in the skull, the supratemporal fenestra, can be seen when viewed from above. The back of the skull (the occiput) is oriented at a slight upward angle, a feature that it shares with all other early synapsids. The upper margin of the skull slopes downward in a convex arc to the tip of the snout. The tip of the upper jaw, formed by the premaxilla bone, is raised above the part of the jaw formed by the maxilla bone to form a maxillary "step". Within this step is a diastema, or gap in the tooth row. Its skull was more heavily built than a dinosaur's.

Teeth 
The size of the teeth varies greatly along the length of the jaws, lending Dimetrodon its name, which means "two measures of tooth" in reference to sets of small and large teeth. One or two pairs of caniniforms (large pointed canine-like teeth) extend from the maxilla. Large incisor teeth are also present at the tips of the upper and lower jaws, rooted in the premaxillae and dentary bones. Small teeth are present around the maxillary "step" and behind the caniniforms, becoming smaller further back in the jaw.

Many teeth are widest at their midsections and narrow closer to the jaws, giving them the appearance of a teardrop. Teardrop-shaped teeth are unique to Dimetrodon and other closely related sphenacodontids, and help distinguish them from other early synapsids. As in many other early synapsids, the teeth of most Dimetrodon species are serrated at their edges. The serrations of Dimetrodon teeth were so fine that they resembled tiny cracks. The dinosaur Albertosaurus had similarly crack-like serrations, but, at the base of each serration was a round void, which would have functioned to distribute force over a larger surface area and prevent the stresses of feeding from causing the crack to spread through the tooth. Unlike Albertosaurus, Dimetrodon teeth lacked adaptations that would stop cracks from forming at their serrations. The teeth of D. teutonis lack serrations, but still have sharp edges.

A 2014 study shows that Dimetrodon was in an arms race against its prey. The smaller species, D. milleri, had no serrations, since it ate small prey. As prey grew larger, several Dimetrodon species started developing serrations on their teeth and increasing in size. For instance, D. limbatus had enamel serrations that helped it cut through flesh (which were similar to the serrations that can be found on Secodontosaurus). The second-largest species, D. grandis, has denticle serrations similar to those of sharks and theropod dinosaurs, making its teeth even more specialized for slicing through flesh. As Dimetrodons prey grew larger, the various species responded by evolving into larger sizes and developing ever-sharper teeth.

 Nasal cavity 
On the inner surface of the nasal section of skull are ridges called nasoturbinals, which may have supported cartilage that increased the area of the olfactory epithelium, the layer of tissue that detects odors. These ridges are much smaller than those of later synapsids from the Late Permian and Triassic, whose large nasoturbinals are taken as evidence for warm-bloodedness because they may have supported mucous membranes that warmed and moistened incoming air. Thus, the nasal cavity of Dimetrodon is transitional between those of early land vertebrates and mammals.

 Jaw joint and ear 
Another transitional feature of Dimetrodon is a ridge in the back of the jaw called the reflected lamina, which is found on the articular bone, which connects to the quadrate bone of the skull to form the jaw joint. In later mammal ancestors, the articular and quadrate separated from the jaw joint, while the articular developed into the malleus bone of the middle ear. The reflected lamina became part of a ring called the tympanic annulus that supports the ear drum in all living mammals.

 Tail 

The tail of Dimetrodon makes up a large portion of its total body length and includes around 50 caudal vertebrae. Tails were missing or incomplete in the first described skeletons of Dimetrodon; the only caudal vertebrae known were the 11 closest to the hip. Since these first few caudal vertebrae narrow rapidly as they progress farther from the hip, many paleontologists in the late 19th and early 20th centuries thought that Dimetrodon had a very short tail. A largely complete tail of Dimetrodon was not described until 1927.

 Sail 

The sail of Dimetrodon is formed by elongated neural spines projecting from the vertebrae. Each spine varies in cross-sectional shape from its base to its tip in what is known as "dimetrodont" differentiation. Near the vertebra body, the spine cross section is laterally compressed into a rectangular shape, and closer to the tip, it takes on a figure-eight shape as a groove runs along either side of the spine. The figure-eight shape is thought to reinforce the spine, preventing bending and fractures. A cross section of the spine of one specimen of Dimetrodon giganhomogenes is rectangular in shape but preserves figure-eight shaped rings close to its center, indicating that the shape of spines may change as individuals age. The microscopic anatomy of each spine varies from base to tip, indicating where it was embedded in the muscles of the back and where it was exposed as part of a sail. The lower or proximal portion of the spine has a rough surface that would have served as an anchoring point for the epaxial muscles of the back, and also has a network of connective tissues called Sharpey's fibers that indicate it was embedded within the body. Higher up on the distal (outer) portion of the spine, the bone surface is smoother. The periosteum, a layer of tissue surrounding the bone, is covered in small grooves that presumably supported the blood vessels that vascularized the sail.

The large groove that runs the length of the spine was once thought to be a channel for blood vessels, but since the bone does not contain vascular canals, the sail is not thought to have been as highly vascularized as once thought. Some specimens of Dimetrodon preserve deformed areas of the neural spines that appear to be healed-over fractures. The cortical bone that grew over these breaks is highly vascularized, suggesting that soft tissue must have been present on the sail to supply the site with blood vessels. Layered lamellar bone makes up most of the neural spine's cross-sectional area, and contains lines of arrested growth that can be used to determine the age of each individual at death. In many specimens of D. gigashomogenes the distal portions of spines bend sharply, indicating that the sail would have had an irregular profile in life. Their crookedness suggests that soft tissue may not have extended all the way to the tips of the spines, meaning that the sail's webbing may not have been as extensive as it is commonly imagined.

 Skin 

No fossil evidence of Dimetrodons skin has yet been found. Impressions of the skin of a related animal, Estemmenosuchus, indicate that it would have been smooth and well-provided with glands, but this form of skin may not have applied to Dimetrodon, as its lineage is fairly distant. Dimetrodon also may have had large scutes on the underside of its tail and belly as other synapsids did. Evidence from the varanopid Ascendonanus suggests that some early synapsids may have had squamate-like scales. However, some recent studies have put varanopids as taxonomically closer to diapsid reptiles.

 Classification history 

 Earliest discoveries 

The earliest discovery of Dimetrodon fossils were of a maxilla recovered in 1845 by a man named Donald McLeod, living in the British colony of Prince Edward Island. These fossils were purchased by John William Johnson, a Canadian geologist, and then described by Joseph Leidy in 1854 as the mandible of Bathygnathus borealis, a large carnivore related to Thecodontosaurus, although it was later reclassified as a species of Dimetrodon in 2015, as Dimetrodon borealis.

 First descriptions by Cope 
Fossils now attributed to Dimetrodon were first studied by American paleontologist Edward Drinker Cope in the 1870s. Cope had obtained the fossils along with those of many other Permian tetrapods from several collectors who had been exploring a group of rocks in Texas called the Red Beds. Among these collectors were Swiss naturalist Jacob Boll, Texas geologist W. F. Cummins, and amateur paleontologist Charles Hazelius Sternberg. Most of Cope's specimens went to the American Museum of Natural History or to the University of Chicago's Walker Museum (most of the Walker fossil collection is now housed in the Field Museum of Natural History).

Sternberg sent some of his own specimens to German paleontologist Ferdinand Broili at Munich University, although Broili was not as prolific as Cope in describing specimens. Cope's rival Othniel Charles Marsh also collected some bones of Dimetrodon, which he sent to the Walker Museum. The first use of the name Dimetrodon came in 1878 when Cope named the species Dimetrodon incisivus, Dimetrodon rectiformis, and Dimetrodon gigas in the scientific journal Proceedings of the American Philosophical Society.

The first description of a Dimetrodon fossil came a year earlier, though, when Cope named the species Clepsydrops limbatus from the Texas Red Beds. (The name Clepsydrops was first coined by Cope in 1875 for sphenacodontid remains from Vermilion County, Illinois, and was later employed for many sphenacontid specimens from Texas; many new species of sphenacodontids from Texas were assigned to either Clepsydrops or Dimetrodon in the late 19th and early 20th centuries.) C. limbatus was reclassified as a species of Dimetrodon in 1940, meaning that Cope's 1877 paper was the first record of Dimetrodon.

Cope was the first to describe a sail-backed synapsid with the naming of C. natalis in his 1878 paper, although he called the sail a fin and compared it to the crests of the modern basilisk lizard (Basilicus). Sails were not preserved in the specimens of D. incisivus and D. gigas that Cope described in his 1878 paper, but elongated spines were present in the D. rectiformis specimen he described. Cope commented on the purpose of the sail in 1886, writing, "The utility is difficult to imagine. Unless the animal had aquatic habits, and swam on its back, the crest or fin must have been in the way of active movements... The limbs are not long enough nor the claws acute enough to demonstrate arboreal habits, as in the existing genus Basilicus, where a similar crest exists."

 Early 20th century descriptions 

In the first few decades of the 20th century, American paleontologist E. C. Case authored many studies on Dimetrodon and described several new species. He received funding from the Carnegie Institution for his study of many Dimetrodon specimens in the collections of the American Museum of Natural History and several other museums. Many of these fossils had been collected by Cope but had not been thoroughly described, as Cope was known for erecting new species on the basis of only a few bone fragments.

Beginning in the late 1920s, paleontologist Alfred Romer restudied many Dimetrodon specimens and named several new species. In 1940, Romer coauthored a large study with Llewellyn Ivor Price called "Review of the Pelycosauria" in which the species of Dimetrodon named by Cope and Case were reassessed. Most of the species names considered valid by Romer and Price are still used today.

 New specimens 
In the decades following Romer and Price's monograph, many Dimetrodon specimens were described from localities outside Texas and Oklahoma. The first was described from the Four Corners region of Utah in 1966 and another was described from Arizona in 1969. In 1975, Olson reported Dimetrodon material from Ohio. A new species of Dimetrodon called D. occidentalis (meaning "western Dimetrodon") was named in 1977 from New Mexico. The specimens found in Utah and Arizona probably also belong to D. occidentalis.

Before these discoveries, a theory existed that a midcontinental seaway separated what is now Texas and Oklahoma from more western lands during the Early Permian, isolating Dimetrodon to a small region of North America, while a smaller sphenacodontid called Sphenacodon dominated the western area. While this seaway probably did exist, the discovery of fossils outside Texas and Oklahoma show that its extent was limited and that it was not an effective barrier to the distribution of Dimetrodon.

In 2001, a new species of Dimetrodon called D. teutonis was described from the Lower Permian Bromacker locality at the Thuringian Forest of Germany, extending the geographic range of Dimetrodon outside North America for the first time.

 Species 
 
Twenty species of Dimetrodon have been named since the genus was first described in 1878. Many have been synonymized with older named species, and some now belong to different genera.

Summary

Dimetrodon limbatus

Dimetrodon limbatus was first described by Edward Drinker Cope in 1877 as Clepsydrops limbatus. (The name Clepsydrops was first coined by Cope in 1875 for sphenacodontid remains from Vermilion County, Illinois, and was later employed for many sphenacontid specimens from Texas; many new species of sphenacodontids from Texas were assigned to either Clepsydrops or Dimetrodon in the late nineteenth and early twentieth centuries.) Based on a specimen from the Red Beds of Texas, it was the first known sail-backed synapsid. In 1940, paleontologists Alfred Romer and Llewellyn Ivor Price reassigned C. limbatus to the genus Dimetrodon, making D. limbatus the type species of Dimetrodon.

Dimetrodon incisivus
The first use of the name Dimetrodon came in 1878 when Cope named the species Dimetrodon incisivus along with Dimetrodon rectiformis and Dimetrodon gigas.

Dimetrodon rectiformis
Dimetrodon rectiformis was named alongside Dimetrodon incisivus in Cope's 1878 paper, and was the only one of the three named species to preserve elongated neural spines. In 1907, paleontologist E. C. Case moved D. rectiformis into the species D. incisivus. D. incisivus was later synonymous with the type species Dimetrodon limbatus, making D. rectiformis a synonym of D. limbatus.

Dimetrodon semiradicatus
Described in 1881 on the basis of upper jaw bones, Dimetrodon semiradicatus was the last species named by Cope. In 1907, E. C. Case synonymized D. semiradicatus with D. incisivus based on similarities in the shape of the teeth and skull bones. D. incisivus''' and D. semiradicatus are now considered synonyms of D. limbatus.

Dimetrodon dollovianusDimetrodon dollovianus was first described by Edward Drinker Cope in 1888 as Embolophorus dollovianus. In 1903, E. C. Case published a lengthy description of E. dollovianus, which he later referred to Dimetrodon.

Dimetrodon grandis

Paleontologist E. C. Case named a new species of sail-backed synapsid, Theropleura grandis, in 1907. In 1940, Alfred Romer and Llewellyn Ivor Price reassigned Theropleura grandis to Dimetrodon, erecting the species D. grandis.

Dimetrodon gigas
In his 1878 paper on fossils from Texas, Cope named Clepsydrops gigas along with the first named species of Dimetrodon, D. limbatus, D. incisivus, and D. rectiformis. Case reclassified C. gigas as a new species of Dimetrodon in 1907. Case also described a very well preserved skull of Dimetrodon in 1904, attributing it to the species Dimetrodon gigas. In 1919, Charles W. Gilmore attributed a nearly complete specimen of Dimetrodon to D. gigas. Dimetrodon gigas is now recognized as a synonym of D. grandis.

Dimetrodon giganhomogenesDimetrodon giganhomogenes was named by E. C. Case in 1907 and is still considered a valid species of Dimetrodon.

Dimetrodon macrospondylusDimetrodon macrospondylus was first described by Cope in 1884 as Clepsydrops macrospondylus. In 1907, Case reclassified it as Dimetrodon macrospondylus.

Dimetrodon platycentrusDimetrodon platycentrus was first described by Case in his 1907 monograph. It is now considered a synonym of Dimetrodon macrospondylus.

Dimetrodon natalis

Paleontologist Alfred Romer erected the species Dimetrodon natalis in 1936, previously described as Clepsydrops natalis. D. natalis was the smallest known species of Dimetrodon at that time, and was found alongside remains of the larger-bodied D. limbatus.

Dimetrodon booneorumDimetrodon booneorum was first described by Alfred Romer in 1937 on the basis of remains from Texas.

"Dimetrodon" kempaeDimetrodon kempae was named by Romer in 1937, in the same paper as D. booneorum, D. loomisi, and D. milleri. Dimetrodon kempae was named on the basis of a single humerus and a few vertebrae, and may therefore be a nomen dubium that cannot be distinguished as a unique species of Dimetrodon. In 1940, Romer and Price raised the possibility that D. kempae may not fall within the genus Dimetrodon, preferring to classify it as Sphenacodontidae incertae sedis.

Dimetrodon loomisiDimetrodon loomisi was first described by Alfred Romer in 1937 along with D. booneorum, D. kempae, and D. milleri. Remains have been found in Texas and Oklahoma.

Dimetrodon milleriDimetrodon milleri was described by Romer in 1937. It is one of the smallest species of Dimetrodon in North America and may be closely related to D. occidentalis, another small-bodied species. D. milleri is known from two skeletons, one nearly complete (MCZ 1365) and another less complete but larger (MCZ 1367). D. milleri is the oldest known species of Dimetrodon.

Besides its small size, D. milleri differs from other species of Dimetrodon in that its neural spines are circular rather than figure-eight shaped in cross-section. Its vertebrae are also shorter in height relative to the rest of the skeleton than those of other Dimetrodon species. The skull is tall and the snout is short relative to the temporal region. A short vertebrae and tall skull are also seen in the species D. booneorum, D. limbatus and D. grandis, suggesting that D. milleri may be the first of an evolutionary progression between these species.

Dimetrodon angelensisDimetrodon angelensis was named by paleontologist Everett C. Olson in 1962. Specimens of the species were reported from the San Angelo Formation of Texas. It is also the largest species of Dimetrodon.

Dimetrodon occidentalisDimetrodon occidentalis was named in 1977 from New Mexico. Its name means "western Dimetrodon" because it is the only North American species of Dimetrodon known west of Texas and Oklahoma. It was named on the basis of a single skeleton belonging to a relatively small individual. The small size of D. occidentalis is similar to that of D. milleri, suggesting a close relationship. Dimetrodon specimens found in Utah and Arizona probably also belong to D. occidentalis.

Dimetrodon teutonisDimetrodon teutonis was named in 2001 from the Thuringian Forest of Germany and was the first species of Dimetrodon to be described outside North America. It is also the smallest species of Dimetrodon.

Species assigned to different genera

Dimetrodon cruciger
In 1878, Cope published a paper called "The Theromorphous Reptilia" in which he described Dimetrodon cruciger. D. cruciger was distinguished by the small projections that extended from either side of each neural spine like the branches of a tree. In 1886, Cope moved D. cruciger to the genus Naosaurus because he considered its spines so different from those of other Dimetrodon species that the species deserved its own genus. Naosaurus would later be synonymized with Edaphosaurus, a genus which Cope named in 1882 on the basis of skulls that evidently belonged to herbivorous animals given their blunt crushing teeth.

Dimetrodon longiramus
E. C. Case named the species Dimetrodon longiramus in 1907 on the basis of a scapula and elongated mandible from the Belle Plains Formation of Texas. In 1940, Romer and Price recognized that the D. longiramus material belonged to the same taxon as another specimen described by paleontologist Samuel Wendell Williston in 1916, which included a similarly elongated mandible and a long maxilla. Williston did not consider his specimen to belong to Dimetrodon but instead classified it as an ophiacodontid. Romer and Price assigned Case and Williston's specimens to a newly erected genus and species, Secodontosaurus longiramus, that was closely related to Dimetrodon.

 Phylogenetic classification Dimetrodon is an early member of a group called synapsids, which include mammals and many of their extinct relatives, though it is not an ancestor of any mammal (which appeared millions of years later). It is often mistaken for a dinosaur in popular culture, despite having become extinct some 40 million years (Ma) before the first appearance of dinosaurs in the Triassic period. As a synapsid, Dimetrodon is more closely related to mammals than to dinosaurs or any living reptile. By the early 1900s most paleontologists called Dimetrodon a reptile in accordance with Linnean taxonomy, which ranked Reptilia as a class and Dimetrodon as a genus within that class. Mammals were assigned to a separate class, and Dimetrodon was described as a "mammal-like reptile". Paleontologists theorized that mammals evolved from this group in (what they called) a reptile-to-mammal transition.

 Phylogenetic taxonomy of Synapsida 

Under phylogenetic systematics, the descendants of the last common ancestor of Dimetrodon and all living reptiles would include all mammals because Dimetrodon is more closely related to mammals than to any living reptile. Thus, if it is desired to avoid the clade that contains both mammals and the living reptiles, then Dimetrodon must not be included in that clade—nor any other "mammal-like reptile". Descendants of the last common ancestor of mammals and reptiles (which appeared around 310 Ma in the Late Carboniferous) are therefore split into two clades: Synapsida, which includes Dimetrodon and mammals, and Sauropsida, which includes living reptiles and all extinct reptiles more closely related to them than to mammals.

Within clade Synapsida, Dimetrodon is part of the clade Sphenacodontia, which was first proposed as an early synapsid group in 1940 by paleontologists Alfred Romer and Llewellyn Ivor Price, along with the groups Ophiacodontia and Edaphosauria. All three groups are known from the Late Carboniferous and Early Permian. Romer and Price distinguished them primarily by postcranial features such as the shapes of limbs and vertebrae. Ophiacodontia was considered the most primitive group because its members appeared the most reptilian, and Sphenacodontia was the most advanced because its members appeared the most like a group called Therapsida, which included the closest relatives to mammals. Romer and Price placed another group of early synapsids called varanopids within Sphenacodontia, considering them to be more primitive than other sphenacodonts like Dimetrodon. They thought varanopids and Dimetrodon-like sphenacodonts were closely related because both groups were carnivorous, although varanopids are much smaller and more lizard-like, lacking sails.

The modern view of synapsid relationships was proposed by paleontologist Robert R. Reisz in 1986, whose study included features mostly found in the skull rather than in the postcranial skeleton. Dimetrodon is still considered a sphenacodont under this phylogeny, but varanodontids are now considered more basal synapsids, falling outside clade Sphenacodontia. Within Sphenacodontia is the group Sphenacodontoidea, which in turn contains Sphenacodontidae and Therapsida. Sphenacodontidae is the group containing Dimetrodon and several other sail-backed synapsids like Sphenacodon and Secodontosaurus, while Therapsida includes mammals and their mostly Permian and Triassic relatives.

Below is the cladogram Clade Synapsida, which follows this phylogeny of Synapsida as modified from the analysis of Benson (2012).

The below cladogram shows the relationships of a few Dimetrodon species, from Brink et al., (2015).

 Paleobiology 

 Function of neural spines 

Paleontologists have proposed many ways in which the sail could have functioned in life. Some of the first to think about its purpose suggested that the sail may have served as camouflage among reeds while Dimetrodon waited for prey, or as an actual boat-like sail to catch the wind while the animal was in the water. Another is that the long neural spines could have stabilized the trunk by restricting up-and-down movement, which would allow for a more efficient side-to-side movement while walking.

 Thermoregulation 
In 1940, Alfred Romer and Llewellyn Ivor Price proposed that the sail served a thermoregulatory function, allowing individuals to warm their bodies with the Sun's heat. In the following years, many models were created to estimate the effectiveness of thermoregulation in Dimetrodon. In 1986, Steven C. Haack concluded that the warming was slower than previously thought and that the process probably took four hours. Using a model based on a variety of environmental factors and hypothesized physiological aspects of Dimetrodon, Haack found that the sail allowed Dimetrodon to warm faster in the morning and reach a slightly higher body temperature during the day, but that it was ineffective in releasing excess heat and did not allow Dimetrodon to retain a higher body temperature at night. In 1999, a group of mechanical engineers created a computer model to analyze the ability of the sail to regulate body temperature during different seasons, and concluded that the sail was beneficial for capturing and releasing heat at all times in the year.

Most of these studies give two thermoregulatory roles for the sail of Dimetrodon: one as a means of warming quickly in the morning, and another as a way to cool down when body temperature becomes high. Dimetrodon and all other Early Permian land vertebrates are assumed to have been cold-blooded or poikilothermic, relying on the sun to maintain a high body temperature. Because of its large size, Dimetrodon had high thermal inertia, meaning that changes in body temperature occurred more slowly in it than in smaller-bodied animals. As temperatures rose in the mornings, the small-bodied prey of Dimetrodon could warm their bodies much faster than could something the size of Dimetrodon. Many paleontologists including Haack have proposed that the sail of Dimetrodon may have allowed it to warm quickly in the morning in order to keep pace with its prey. The sail's large surface area also meant heat could dissipate quickly into the surroundings, useful if the animal needed to release excess heat produced by metabolism or absorbed from the sun. Dimetrodon may have angled its sail away from the sun to cool off or restricted blood flow to the sail to maintain heat at night.

In 1986, J. Scott Turner and C. Richard Tracy proposed that the evolution of a sail in Dimetrodon was related to the evolution of warm-bloodedness in mammal ancestors. They thought that the sail of Dimetrodon enabled it to be homeothermic, maintaining a constant, albeit low, body temperature. Mammals are also homeothermic, although they differ from Dimetrodon in being endothermic, controlling their body temperature internally through heightened metabolism. Turner and Tracy noted that early therapsids, a more advanced group of synapsids closely related to mammals, had long limbs which can release heat in a manner similar to that of the sail of Dimetrodon. The homeothermy that developed in animals like Dimetrodon may have carried over to therapsids through a modification of body shape, which would eventually develop into the warm-bloodedness of mammals.

Recent studies on the sail of Dimetrodon and other sphenacodontids support Haack's 1986 contention that the sail was poorly adapted to releasing heat and maintaining a stable body temperature. The presence of sails in small-bodied species of Dimetrodon such as D. milleri and D. teutonis does not fit the idea that the sail's purpose was thermoregulation because smaller sails are less able to transfer heat and because small bodies can absorb and release heat easily on their own. Moreover, close relatives of Dimetrodon such as Sphenacodon have very low crests that would have been useless as thermoregulatory devices. The large sail of Dimetrodon is thought to have developed gradually from these smaller crests, meaning that over most of the sail's evolutionary history, thermoregulation could not have served an important function.

Although the function of its sail remains uncertain, Dimetrodon and other Sphenacodontids were likely to have been whole-body endotherms, characterised by a high energy metabolism (tachymetabolism) and probably a capacity for maintaining a high and stable body temperature. This conclusion was part of an amniote-wide study that found tachymetabolic endothermy to have been widespread throughout, and likely plesiomorphic to both synapsids and sauropsids. For Dimetrodon the evidence was the endothermy-indicative size of the foramina through which blood was delivered to their long bones and the high blood pressure that would have been necessary to provide blood to the tops of the well-vascularised spines supporting the sail.

Larger bodied specimens of Dimetrodon have larger sails relative to their size, an example of positive allometry. Positive allometry may benefit thermoregulation because it means that, as individuals get larger, surface area increases faster than mass. Larger-bodied animals generate a great deal of heat through metabolism, and the amount of heat that must be dissipated from the body surface is significantly greater than what must be dissipated by smaller-bodied animals. Effective heat dissipation can be predicted across many different animals with a single relationship between mass and surface area. However, a 2010 study of allometry in Dimetrodon found a different relationship between its sail and body mass: the actual scaling exponent of the sail was much larger than the exponent expected in an animal adapted to heat dissipation. The researchers concluded that the sail of Dimetrodon grew at a much faster rate than was necessary for thermoregulation, and suggested that sexual selection was the primary reason for its evolution.

 Sexual selection 
The allometric exponent for sail height is similar in magnitude to the scaling of interspecific antler length to shoulder height in cervids. Furthermore, as Bakker (1970) observed in the context of Dimetrodon, many lizard species raise a dorsal ridge of skin during threat and courtship displays, and positively allometric, sexually dimorphic frills and dewlaps are present in extant lizards (Echelle et al. 1978; Christian et al. 1995). There is also evidence of sexual dimorphism both in the robustness of the skeleton and in the relative height of the spines of D. limbatus (Romer and Price 1940).

 Sexual dimorphism Dimetrodon may have been sexually dimorphic, meaning that males and females had slightly different body sizes. Some specimens of Dimetrodon have been hypothesized as males because they have thicker bones, larger sails, longer skulls, and more pronounced maxillary "steps" than others. Based on these differences, the mounted skeletons in the American Museum of Natural History (AMNH 4636) and the Field Museum of Natural History may be males and the skeletons in the Denver Museum of Nature and Science (MCZ 1347) and the University of Michigan Museum of Natural History may be females.

 Paleoecology 

Fossils of Dimetrodon are known from the United States (Texas, Oklahoma, New Mexico, Arizona, Utah and Ohio) and Germany, areas that were part of the supercontinent Euramerica during the Early Permian. Within the United States, almost all material attributed to Dimetrodon has come from three geological groups in north-central Texas and south-central Oklahoma: the Clear Fork Group, the Wichita Group, and the Pease River Group.Nelson, John W., Robert W. Hook, and Dan S. Chaney (2013). Lithostratigraphy of the Lower Permian (Leonardian) Clear Fork Formation of North-Central Texas from The Carboniferous-Permian Transition: Bulletin 60, ed. Spencer G. Lucas et al. New Mexico Museum of Natural History and Science, pg. 286-311. Retrieved December 28, 2017. Most fossil finds are part of lowland ecosystems which, during the Permian, would have been vast wetlands. In particular, the Red Beds of Texas is an area of great diversity of fossil tetrapods, or four-limbed vertebrates. In addition to Dimetrodon, the most common tetrapods in the Red Beds and throughout Early Permian deposits in the southwestern United States, are the amphibians Archeria, Diplocaulus, Eryops, and Trimerorhachis, the reptiliomorph Seymouria, the reptile Captorhinus, and the synapsids Ophiacodon and Edaphosaurus. These tetrapods made up a group of animals that paleontologist Everett C. Olson called the "Permo-Carboniferous chronofauna", a fauna that dominated the continental Euramerican ecosystem for several million years. Based on the geology of deposits like the Red Beds, the fauna is thought to have inhabited a well-vegetated lowland deltaic ecosystem.

 Food web 

Olson made many inferences on the paleoecology of the Texas Red beds and the role of Dimetrodon within its ecosystem. He proposed several main types of ecosystems in which the earliest tetrapods lived. Dimetrodon belonged to the most primitive ecosystem, which developed from aquatic food webs. In it, aquatic plants were the primary producers and were largely fed upon by fish and aquatic invertebrates. Most land vertebrates fed on these aquatic primary consumers. Dimetrodon was probably the top predator of the Red Beds ecosystem, feeding on a variety of organisms such as the shark Xenacanthus, the aquatic amphibians Trimerorhachis and Diplocaulus, and the terrestrial tetrapods Seymouria and Trematops. Insects are known from the Early Permian Red Beds and were probably involved to some degree in the same food web as Dimetrodon, feeding small reptiles like Captorhinus. The Red Beds assemblage also included some of the first large land-living herbivores like Edaphosaurus and Diadectes. Feeding primarily on terrestrial plants, these herbivores did not derive their energy from aquatic food webs. According to Olson, the best modern analogue for the ecosystem Dimetrodon inhabited is the Everglades. The exact lifestyle of Dimetrodon (amphibious to terrestrial) has long been controversial, but bone microanatomy supports a terrestrial lifestyle, which implies that it would have fed mostly on land, on the banks, or in very shallow water. Evidence also exists for Dimetrodon preying on aestivating Diplocaulus during times of drought, with three partially eaten juvenile Diplocaulus in a burrow of eight bearing teeth marks from a Dimetrodon that unearthed and killed them.

The only species of Dimetrodon found outside the southwestern United States is D. teutonis from Germany. Its remains were found in the Tambach Formation in a fossil site called the Bromacker locality. The Bromacker's assemblage of Early Permian tetrapods is unusual in that there are few large-bodied synapsids serving the role of top predators. D. teutonis is estimated to have been only  in length, too small to prey on the large diadectid herbivores that are abundant in the Bromacker assemblage. It more likely ate small vertebrates and insects. Only three fossils can be attributed to large predators, and they are thought to have been either large varanopids or small sphenacodonts, both of which could potentially prey on D. teutonis. In contrast to the lowland deltaic Red Beds of Texas, the Bromacker deposits are thought to have represented an upland environment with no aquatic species. It is possible that large-bodied carnivores were not part of the Bromacker assemblage because they were dependent on large aquatic amphibians for food.

See also

 
 

 References 

 External links 

 Dimetrodon Palaeos page on Dimetrodon Introduction to the Pelycosaurs University of California Museum of Paleontology webpage on early synapsids, including Dimetrodon''
 

Permian Germany
Sphenacodontidae
Cisuralian synapsids of Europe
Cisuralian synapsids of North America
Prehistoric synapsid genera
Transitional fossils
Taxa named by Edward Drinker Cope
Fossil taxa described in 1878
Cisuralian genus first appearances
Cisuralian genus extinctions
Apex predators